Andrzej Liczik (born 4 March 1977 in Feodosiya, Krym, Ukraine) is a boxer from Poland.

He participated at the 2004 Summer Olympics for his native country. There he was stopped in the second round of the Bantamweight (54 kg) division by Uzbekistan's eventual bronze medalist Bahodirjon Sooltonov.

Liczik won the bronze medal in the same division six months earlier, at the 2004 European Amateur Boxing Championships in Pula, Croatia.

References
Yahoo! Sports
sports-reference

1977 births
Living people
Bantamweight boxers
Boxers at the 2004 Summer Olympics
Olympic boxers of Poland
People from Feodosia
Polish male boxers
21st-century Polish people
20th-century Polish people